Phyllis Busansky (March 3, 1937 – June 23, 2009) was the Democratic Commissioner of Hillsborough County, Florida from 1989 to 1997. In 1995 she was named a "Public Official of the Year" by Governing magazine, She ran in Florida's 9th congressional district election, 2006, unsuccessfully. She defeated incumbent Buddy Johnson in the November 2008 election for Hillsborough Supervisor of Elections.

Busansky served Hillsborough County in a number of roles including Aging Services Director, Human Resources Director, County Commissioner. She was the first Executive Director of Florida's welfare-to-work agency (WAGES), under former Governors Lawton Chiles and Jeb Bush. The agency had a $1.2 billion annual budget.

Death
Busansky, 72, a native of Hartford, Connecticut, was attending the Florida State Association of Supervisor of Elections conference in St. Augustine, Florida with members of her staff. When she didn't show up for the conference, coworkers came looking for her, and found her dead in her hotel room.

References

External links
ABC Action News report

1937 births
2009 deaths
County commissioners in Florida
Florida Democrats
Jewish American people in Florida politics
People from Hillsborough County, Florida
Politicians from Hartford, Connecticut
20th-century American politicians
Wheaton College (Massachusetts) alumni
20th-century American Jews
21st-century American Jews